Abzal Rakimgaliev (born 25 May 1992) is a Kazakhstani figure skater. He is the 2007 Kazakhstani national champion and has won seven senior international medals. He competed at the 2010 Olympics in Vancouver, where he placed 26th, and at the 2014 Olympics in Sochi, where he placed 22nd.

Programs

Competitive highlights 
CS: Challenger Series; JGP: Junior Grand Prix

References

External links 

 
 Abzal Rakimgaliev at Tracings.net

Kazakhstani male single skaters
Sportspeople from Almaty
1992 births
Living people
Figure skaters at the 2010 Winter Olympics
Figure skaters at the 2014 Winter Olympics
Olympic figure skaters of Kazakhstan
Figure skaters at the 2011 Asian Winter Games
Figure skaters at the 2017 Asian Winter Games
Asian Games competitors for Kazakhstan
Competitors at the 2015 Winter Universiade
Competitors at the 2013 Winter Universiade
Competitors at the 2017 Winter Universiade